The 2009 W-League Season was the league's 15th.  The regular season began on May 8 with the Hampton Roads Piranhas defeating the Charlotte Lady Eagles 2–1 in Charlotte. The season ended with 10 games on July 19. The playoffs began on July 22 and ended on August 7.

Pali Blues repeated as W-League champions, defeating the Washington Freedom Reserves in come-from-behind fashion 2–1, which was also how they had won their previous title. Iris Mora was named the Playoffs MVP.

FC Indiana's Laura del Río finished with the most points (40) and goals (18), while her teammate Monica Ocampo led the league in assists (11). Shannon Lynn, also of FC Indiana, led the league in GAA (0.116) and shutouts (10), and only allowed 2 goals the entire regular season.

Changes from 2008 season

Name Changes 
Six teams changed their name in the off-season:

Expansion Teams 
Two teams were added for the season:

Teams Leaving 
Six teams folded after the 2008 season:
 Bradenton Athletics
 Carolina Dynamo
 Fredericksburg Lady Gunners
 Michigan Hawks
 Vermont Lady Voltage
 West Virginia Illusion

Jersey Sky Blue and Washington Freedom both have expansion teams in Women's Professional Soccer.  Washington have chosen to keep their reserve squad in the W-League, while Jersey has sold the rights to their W-League team to New York-based Quickstrike FC, which became Hudson Valley Quickstrike Lady Blues.

Standings

Orange indicates W-League title and bye into W-League semifinals.
Purple indicates division title clinched
Green indicates playoff berth clinched

Central Conference

Great Lakes Division

Midwest Division

Eastern Conference

Atlantic Division

Northeast Division

Western Conference

Playoffs

Format
The Hudson Valley Quickstrike Lady Blues earned a bye directly to the W-League Semifinals. The Washington Freedom Reserves were moved into the top spot in the Northeast Division, and the Charlotte Lady Eagles received the division's second playoff spot (the Boston Renegades were the original holders of the second spot, but declined to enter).

The Central Conference will have 5 playoff spots.  The second and third place teams from the Great Lakes Division will play each other.  The winner will play the Midwest Division champions, while the Great Lakes Division champion will play the second place team of the Midwest Division.  The winners of those games will play to determine the conference champion. The Eastern Conference division champions will play the second place team of the opposite division, the winners facing off to determine who goes to the W-League Semifinals.  The Western Conference will have their top two teams facing off to determine their conference champion.

The W-League Semifinals will put the regular season champion against the lowest seeded conference champion, and the higher-ranked conference champions against each other. The winners of these games will play in the championship, while the losers will play in the Third Place game.

Conference Brackets
Central Conference

Eastern Conference

Western Conference

W-League Championship Bracket

Divisional Round

Conference semifinals

Conference finals

W-League Semifinals

W-League Championship

Awards
The finalists for W-League MVP, U19 Player of the Year, Coach of the Year, and Defender of the Year were announced on August 3, 2009, with the winners to be announced on August 5. The Goalkeeper of the Year was announced on August 3.

Most Valuable Player Finalists
 Angelika Johansson, F, Hudson Valley Quickstrike Lady Blues (Winner)
 Laura del Río, F, FC Indiana
 Amber Hearn, F, Ottawa Fury Women

U19 Player of the Year Finalists
 Chanté Sandiford, G, Washington Freedom Reserves (Winner)
 Sarah Chapman, M, Tampa Bay Hellenic
 Fortuna Velaj, F, Connecticut Passion

Defender of the Year Finalists
 Brittany Taylor, Hudson Valley Quickstrike Lady Blues (Winner)
 Ashleigh Gunning, Hudson Valley Quickstrike Lady Blues
 Ria Percival, Ottawa Fury Women

Goalkeeper of the Year
 Michelle Betos, Atlanta Silverbacks Women

Coach of the Year Finalists
 Fabien Cottin, Quebec City Arsenal (Winner)
 Tony Anglin, Chicago Red Eleven
 George Fotopoulos, Tampa Bay Hellenic
 Jesse Kolmel, Hudson Valley Quickstrike Lady Blues

All-League and All-Conference teams

Central Conference
F: Laura del Río*, IND; Amber Hearn*, OTT; Caroline Smith, MIN
M: Gemma Davison*, CHI; Jennifer Hance, OTT; Fatima Leyva, IND; Rosa Tantillo*, BUF
D: Jenny Jeffers, CHI; Ria Percival*, OTT; Clare Rustad, TOR
G: Shannon Lynn, IND
Honorable Mention: Margaret Allgeier, D, FW; Haley Ford, D, CLE; Christina Julien, F, LAV; Melissa Lesage, F, QC; Heather MacDougall, M, HAM; Courtney Nash, M, WMi; Anna Stinson, M, KAL; Jenn Wolbert, G, LON; Casey Zimney, D, ROC

Eastern Conference
F: Angelika Johansson*, HV; Jen Parsons, WAS; Brittany Tegeler, WAS
M: Lindsay Ozimek, CHA; Christina Rife, CHA; Megan Tomlinson, ATL
D: Casey Brown, BOS; Ashleigh Gunning*, HV; Philisha Lewis, TB; Brittany Taylor*, HV
G: Michelle Betos*, ATL
Honorable Mention: Mary Casey, G, NV; Brooke DeRosa, M, LI; Shaneka Gordon, F, HR; Robyn Jones, G, NJ; Courtney McMahon, M, NY; Rachel Richards, M, WMa; Fortuna Velaj, F, & Lindsay Vera, F, CON; Jennifer Woodie, D, RIC

Western Conference
F: Iris Mora, PAL; Jodi Ann Robinson, VAN
M: Michelle French*, SEA; Tobin Heath, PAL; Nikki Marshall, COL; Carmelina Moscato, VAN; Nikki Washington*, PAL
D: Jenea Gibbons, LA; Kelli Smith, SEA; Leah Tapscott, PAL
G: Katie Hultin, SEA
Honorable Mention: Kay Hawke, G, VEN, Taryn Hemmings, M, RC

* denotes All-League selections.

See also
United Soccer Leagues 2009
2009 PDL Season

Source website
USL historical stats

References

USL W-League (1995–2015) seasons
2
2009 United Soccer Leagues
W